Robert Cassilly may refer to:
Robert Cassilly (politician), American politician in Maryland
Bob Cassilly, American artist